Colin Johnson (born 5 September 1947, Pocklington, Yorkshire, England) is an English first-class cricketer,  who played 100 matches for Yorkshire County Cricket Club between 1969 and 1979.

He scored 2,960 runs as a right-handed middle order batsman at 21.44, with two centuries against Somerset and Gloucestershire.  In 102 one day games he scored 1,615 runs at 20.18, with a top score of 73 not out.  He also took four first-class wickets with his occasional off breaks, and two more in one day cricket.

He was a stalwart for Yorkshire's Second XI, playing from 1966 to 1985, and captaining the side after he left the first-class scene. He was awarded the captaincy at the expense of Barrie Leadbeater, who had been promised the job, but was then released by Yorkshire and became a first-class umpire.

Johnson worked full-time in the field of life insurance, once his playing days had ended.

References

External links
Cricinfo Profile
Cricket Archive Statistics

1947 births
Living people
English cricketers
Yorkshire cricketers
People from Pocklington
Cricketers from Yorkshire
People educated at Pocklington School